Women With Vision! is an English-language Canadian magazine of women's lifestyles and entrepreneurship.

The magazine and website cover a variety of women's interests, from fashion, life coaching, motivational speaking, beauty, home garden and decor, to current affairs, the arts, health, food and entertainment. It is distributed throughout the Georgian Triangle, which includes: Owen Sound, Meaford, Thornbury, Blue Mountains, Collingwood, Wasaga Beach, Stayner, Midland, Barrie, Cookstown and Alliston. It is also distributed at trade show and mailed through subscription by Canada Post to the Greater Toronto Area, the Golden Horseshoe and the United States.

Since 1998, the magazine has featured such notable woman as Tracy Moore, olympian Silken Laumann, Canadian Fashion design Linda Lundstrom, Breakfast Television's Jennifer Valentyne, 98.1 CHFI's Radio personality Erin Davis, singer-songwriter Amy Sky, and reporter Anne Mroczkowski.

The magazine celebrated its 13th anniversary in the fall of 2011.

Recognition
In 2005, 2006, 2009 & 2010, the magazine and its Founder/Publisher Lorraine Leslie, were named as a nominee for the Royal Bank of Canada Canadian Woman Entrepreneur Award.

References

External links
 Women With Vision! magazine website

1998 establishments in Ontario
Lifestyle magazines published in Canada
Magazines established in 1998
Magazines published in Ontario
Quarterly magazines published in Canada
Women's magazines published in Canada